Aref El Rayess (or Aref Rayess) (25 October 1928 – 27 January 2005) was a Lebanese painter and sculptor.

Life
Born in Beirut, Aref Rayess started his career as a self-taught artist exhibiting for the first time in 1948. He lived in Africa for many years during which he traveled between Senegal and Paris. In Paris, he joined the studios of Fernand Léger, André Lhote, Marcel Marceau and Ossip Zadkine while studying at the Académie de la Grande Chaumière. In 1957, he returned to Lebanon, but left again for Florence in 1959 with a scholarship from the Italian government. From 1960 to 1963, he lived in Rome where he went on studying and exhibiting. In 1963, he returned to Lebanon.

Rayess participated in many group shows including the biennales of São Paulo (1960) and Bagdad (1974); the Unesco exhibition in Montreal (1978); the Mall Galleries, London (1986) and the Salons of the Sursock Museum, Beirut (1961, 1962, 1963, 1965, 1966, 1968). He has held more than fifteen solo shows in Lebanon.

Internationally, his Individual exhibitions include: the Poliani Gallery, Rome (1959); Numero Gallery, Florence (1959); D'Arcy Gallery, New York; Excelsior Gallery, Mexico (1964); the Rodin Museum, Paris (1966); a retrospective of his works, 1957–1968, at the National Museum of Damascus (1969); Ornina Gallery, Damascus (1974), Gallery Rasim, Algeria (1976) and in Venezuela.

He was commissioned by the Lebanese government to design and execute a tapestry presented to the Unesco centre in Paris. The Lebanese government also requested him to create two sculptures to represent Lebanon at the World Fair in New York.

Aref El Rayess won several awards in Lebanon. These include: the Lebanese Ministry of National Education Award for the 1955 spring exhibition, the Unesco Prize for the Spring Salon of 1957, the Ministry of Public Works First and Second Prize for Sculpture (1963), the Sursock Museum Grand Prix de Sculpture (1965–66) for different works exhibited and their First Prize for Sculpture (1966–67) as well as the Ministry of Tourism First and Second Prizes (1966).

President of the Lebanese Artists Association – Painters and Sculptors, El Rayess taught for many years at the Lebanese University and the American Lebanese University. With the outbreak of the civil war in Lebanon, he relocated to Saudi Arabia and was appointed as the city of Jeddah's art consultant for many years. He had been commissioned by the Saudi Arabian government to produce several sculptures. One of the most outstanding is that of the stylized name of Allah. Designed by him and built in Italy from aluminum, it stands twenty seven meters high in Palestine Square in Jeddah. Among the artist's most recent works is a series of oil paintings capturing the nature and feeling of the Arabian desert.

The artist died in January 2005.

Work
Aref El Rayess was a prolific artist, mainly known as a painter, he also practiced etching, sculpture and tapestry. One of his tapestries, The Signs of Cadmus, is part of the collection of the Unesco Palace in Paris.

His work is widely based on the human being and its relationship to nature and history, stating that "Man is a unity that embodies both the means and the goals...".

In the 1960s his painting evolved around Man and the Third World and in the early 1970s, he unexpectedly presented an exhibition related to whorehouses off Martyrs' Square, Beirut.

With the outbreak of the Lebanese Civil War, El Rayess was one of the artists who interpreted the tragic events in art. Staying in Algiers, he produced in 1976 a series of etchings entitled The Road to Peace. This work gave its name to an exhibition Saleh Barakat curated in 2009 at the Beirut Art Center, encompassing Lebanese visual arts between 1975 and 1991. Apart from the etching series, oil paintings depicting the horror of war were featured in the exhibition. In these troubled times, El Rayess showed political involvement in creating a poster commemorating the assassination of the Druze leader Kamal Jumblatt.

Aref El Rayess also developed a practice of abstract sculpture. He was commissioned monumental works for the city of Jeddah, including a piece named "Swords of God (Soyuf Allah)".

Auctions
Paintings by El Rayess are relatively few in the auction market. In October 2007, Labyrinths of the Millenium was proposed at $30,000 – $35,000 and hammered at $37,000. One year later, H. T. M. (Human, Time and Machine) was offered for $60,000 – $80,000 and was sold at $62,500.

Publications

Most of the book can be found with his daughter Hala Aref El Rayess, and a few at "RectoVerso" a library dedicated to art in Lebanon.

2012 – http://www.beirutexhibitioncenter.com/exhibitions/art-lebanon 

2004 – "Al Layl Al Tṭawīl Wa’al Kalimah" (The Long Night and The Word) OCLC Number:	64576609

2003 – "Al Ayyām Al Ramādīyah: Alwān, Aḥruf, Suwar" (The Gray Days: Colors, Letters, Pictures) Riad El Rayess Books –   

2001 –  A Dedication to his daughter "Hodourak Fi Ghiyab Al Thol" (Your presence in the absence of the shadow) Publishing house and ISBN not available.

2000 – "Matahat Jamila" (Beautiful Maze) Nawfal Publishing – ISBN not available.

1999 –  A Selection of Interviews "Rehlah Dakhel al-Zat" (A journey within my self) Dar AlJadeed Publishing – ISBN not available.

1982 –  One Hundred Years of Plastic Arts in Lebanon 1880–1980 Imprimerie Catholique sal, Araya, Lebanon – ISBN not available.

1976 – "Tarik al Salam" (The Road to Peace) Illustration of the 1975 War in Lebanon OCLC Number:	 41596994

1972 –  A Manifesto by Rayess "Maa' Man, Wa Dud Man" (With Who, and Against Whom) Publishing house and ISBN not available due to its contents.

Selected exhibitions

Solo exhibitions
 Noir et Blanc – Temps et Homme d'Aref Rayess, Espace SD, Beirut, 2002
 2001 – Chants du carré – Galerie Janine Rubeiz, Beirut, Lebanon
 1997 – Gallery World of Art, Beirut, Lebanon
 1996 – Galerie Janine Rubeiz, Beirut, Lebanon
 1995 – Centre Culturel Français, Beirut, Lebanon 
 1993 – Hommage au petit prince, French Cultural Center, Beirut
 1979 – Galerie Epreuve d’Artiste, Beirut, Lebanon
 1978 – Exposition Caracas, Venezuela
 1976 – Galerie Racim, Algeria 
 1975 – Gallery Le Point, Beirut, Lebanon
 1973 – The Flowers of rue Al Moutanabbi, Galerie Contact, Beirut, Lebanon
 1972 – Gallery One, Beirut,Lebanon
 1971 – Galerie Manoug, Beirut, Lebanon
 1969/1970 – Dar El Fan, Beirut, Lebanon
 1968 – L’Orient le Jour, Beirut, Lebanon
 1967 – Gallery One, Beirut, Lebanon
 1965 – Galerie Excelsior, Mexico
 1964 – D'Arcy Gallery, New York
 1964 – Galerie La Licorne, Beirut, Lebanon
 1961/1963 – Galerie La Licorne, Beirut, Lebanon
 1958/1961 Rome, Florence, Venise – Italy
 1958 – Galerie Alecco Saab, Beirut, Lebanon
 1957 – Italian Cultural Center, Beirut, Lebanon
 1954 – Dakar, Senegal, Africa
 1948 – American University of Beirut, West Hall, Lebanon

Group exhibitions
 Art from Lebanon, Beirut Exhibition Center, 2012

Collective exhibitions
1948 – Unesco, Lebanon
1955/1957 – Ministry of Education, Lebanon
1961/1966 – Sursock Museum, Lebanon
1960 – Biennale São Paulo, Brazil 
1964 – New York World Fair, USA
1967 – Biennale Musée Rodin, Paris
1968 – International Exposition, New York
1974 −1ere Biennale des Artistes Arabes, Baghdad
1979 – Ministry of Tourism, Lebanon
1980 – Unesco, Lebanon

Private collections
Musée du Ministère de L’Education Nationale, Lebanon
Musée Sursock, Lebanon
Musée d’Art Contemporain, Irak
Musée d’Art Contemporain, Syrie
Musée National, Algérie

Awards
 1955 – Prix de l’Education Nationale Salon du Printemps
 1957 – UNESCO Awards in the Salon du Printemps 
 1963 – Premier et Second prix du Concours de Ministère des travaux Publique pour le Palais de Justice (National 1st & 2nd Prize)
 1965/1966 – Sursock Museum's awards for Sculpture & Painting in the Salon D’Automne 
 1966 – Premier prix et Deuxième prix du concours de Sculpture du comite d’embellissement de la cite Libanaise
 1967 – First Prize at the Sursock Museum's Award for Painting in the Salon D'Automne
 1982 – The Tarua Europe's Award in Rome
Musée National, Kuwait
Musée National Jordan
Musee de Jeddah, Arabie Saoudite
Musee de Tabouk, Arabie Saoudite
Old Hundred Museum, New York, USA
Roosevelt Museum, Philadelphia, USA
Palais de L’UNESCO, Paris, France

References

External links
Aref Rayess at the Mokbel Art Collection

Lebanese sculptors
1928 births
2005 deaths
20th-century Lebanese painters